"Senses Working Overtime" is a song written by Andy Partridge of the English rock band XTC, released as the lead single from their 1982 album English Settlement. He based the song on Manfred Mann's "5-4-3-2-1" (1964). The album and single became the highest-charting records XTC would ever have in the UK, peaking at number five and number 10, respectively.

At the suggestion of its director, the song's music video was filmed at double-speed and then slowed down, to make the musicians appear "more graceful". Partridge recalled: "That one was done really quickly, in Shepperton Studios while we were rehearsing for the English Settlement tour. And so that's us rehearsing. ... [The half-speed idea has] been used a hell of a lot since then, but I think we were the first ones to do it."

Track listing
"Senses Working Overtime" (Andy Partridge)
"Blame the Weather" (Colin Moulding)
"Tissue Tigers (The Arguers)" (Partridge)
On the 12" release, "Egyptian Solution (Thebes in a Box) (Homo Safari #3)" (Partridge) was added to the A-side as track 2; the B-side comprised "Blame the Weather" and "Tissue Tigers" on both 7" and 12".

Personnel
XTC
Terry Chambers – drums, drum synthesiser
Dave Gregory – electric 12–string guitar, percussion
Colin Moulding – fretless bass, backing vocals
Andy Partridge – lead and backing vocals, acoustic guitar

Charts

Weekly charts

Year-end charts

Mandy Moore version

"Senses Working Overtime" was the third single released from Moore's third studio album Coverage (2003). It was written by Andy Partridge and produced by John Fields. 

The song was included on Moore’s first greatest hits album The Best of Mandy Moore (2004).

Other versions
 1995: Spacehog, A Testimonial Dinner: The Songs of XTC

References

External links
 

1982 singles
2004 singles
XTC songs
Mandy Moore songs
Songs written by Andy Partridge
1982 songs
Song recordings produced by Hugh Padgham
Epic Records singles
Virgin Records singles
Progressive pop songs